Lawrence R. Klemin (born March 31, 1945) is an American politician and lawyer in the state of North Dakota. He is a member of the North Dakota House of Representatives, representing the 47th district. A Republican, he was first elected in 1998. Klemin attended the University of North Dakota where earned a Bachelor of Arts degree, and the University of North Dakota School of Law. Admitted to the bar in 1978, he later worked as an attorney in the practice Bucklin, Klemin and McBride. Klemin is also a veteran of the Vietnam War, serving in the United States Army's 101st Airborne Division.

References

1945 births
21st-century American politicians
Living people
Speakers of the North Dakota House of Representatives
Republican Party members of the North Dakota House of Representatives
United States Army personnel of the Vietnam War
People from Eddy County, North Dakota
University of North Dakota alumni